Ancient road at ( extending to ) is the unearthed section of an ancient road in the historical city of Tarsus, Turkey.

Tarsus, an ancient city known as the birthplace of Paul the Apostle, is now a major district center in Mersin Province, Turkey. The road was accidentally unearthed in a construction pit in 1993. The construction was abandoned and the road is now surrounded by mesh wire panel for protection.

The road was undoubtedly constructed during the Roman Empire period and probably in the first century AD. The width of the road is  The construction material is basalt stone and underneath the road a sewage system had been laid down which makes the road unique among the other Anatolian roads of the era. On the west and east of the road there are stylobates.

There is a Roman road at the north of Tarsus, but it is not known if the two roads were connected during the ancient ages.

References 

Roman sites in Turkey
Tarsus, Mersin
Roman roads in Turkey
Historic roads in Turkey
Archaeological sites in Mersin Province, Turkey